The First Night of My Life is a 1998 Spanish comedy film directed by Miguel Albaladejo. It was produced as part of the 2000, Seen By... project, initiated by the French company Haut et Court to produce films depicting the approaching turn of the millennium seen from the perspectives of 10 different countries.

Cast 
 Leonor Watling - Paloma
 Juanjo Martínez - Manuel
 Carlos Fuentes - Johnny
 Roberto Hernández - Litri
 Emilio Gutiérrez Caba - Padre de Paloma
 Mariola Fuentes - Jasmina
 Anna Lizaran - Madre de Joselito

References

External links 

1998 comedy films
1998 films
Spanish comedy films
1990s Spanish films